2-hydroxyethylphosphonate dioxygenase (HEPD, phpD (gene)) is an enzyme with systematic name 2-hydroxyethylphosphonate:O2 1,2-oxidoreductase (hydroxymethylphosphonate forming). This enzyme catalyses the following chemical reaction

 2-hydroxyethylphosphonate + O2  hydroxymethylphosphonate + formate

2-hydroxyethylphosphonate dioxygenase contains non-heme-Fe(II).

References

External links 
 

EC 1.13.11